Mutusjärvi is a medium-sized lake in the Paatsjoki main catchment area in Lapland region in Finland. Lake is Oligotroph.

See also
List of lakes in Finland

References

Lakes of Inari, Finland